Rudny is a rural locality (a settlement) in Novooskolsky District, Belgorod Oblast, Russia. The population was 429 as of 2010.

Geography 
Rudny is located 5 km northeast of Novy Oskol (the district's administrative centre) by road. Novy Oskol is the nearest rural locality.

References 

Rural localities in Novooskolsky District

Renamed localities of Belgorod Oblast